Damayanti Tambay is a former badminton player and the wife of Flt lt V. V. Tambay (one of the missing 54 Indian defence personnel from the 1971 Indo-Pak war who are believed to be in Pakistani custody).

Biography 
During the 1971 Indo-Pak war, on 5 December 1971, Tambay's husband Vijay Vasant Tambay, Flight Lieutenant of Indian Army was captured as the enemy by Pakistan Army. Consequently, Tambay had taken several initiatives to bring back her husband along with the other 46 war prisoners, but was not successful and the official standpoint of Indian Army was that all the missing personnel died. By 1971, Damayanti Tambay had won three consecutive National women's singles. But she announced her retirement in 1971, at the age of 23 after her husband got captured in the missing 54 incident of 1971 Indo-Pak war taking the vow that she would not resume her career in badminton unless she gets her husband back or receives the confirmed news that her husband was dead.

She later became a leading member of the Missing defence personnel association. She is currently serving as the deputy director of physical education at Jawaharlal Nehru University.

In popular Culture

Film
A short film on 1971 Indo-Pak War featuring Damayanti Tambay was directed by Akanksha Damini Joshi. The short film directed by Joshi in 2005 for Janmat voices the concern and hope of Damayanti Tambay who has awaited the return of her husband for nearly five decades.

Notes 

 Koul, M. G. (. P. (2014). The Silence Speaks. United Kingdom: Partridge Publishing India.
 Chatterji, S. A. (2015). Filming Reality: The Independent Documentary Movement in India. India: SAGE Publications.

References

Indian female badminton players
Indian national badminton champions
Indian women activists
Academic staff of Jawaharlal Nehru University
Living people
1948 births
20th-century Indian women
20th-century Indian people
Sportswomen from Delhi
Activists from Delhi
Indian human rights activists
Recipients of the Arjuna Award